Eliza Field may refer to:

 Elizabeth Field (author) (1804–1890), English-born Canadian writer and artist
 Eliza Riddle Field (1812–1871), American stage actress